The Dolgaya Spit or Kosa Dolgaya is a sandy spit in the Sea of Azov. The spit is located in Yeysky District of Krasnodar Krai, Russia. It separates Taganrog Bay from the Sea of Azov.

Dolgaya Spit is a landscape nature sanctuary of Krasnodar Krai with unique sandy beaches, quite deep sea, fresh-water lakes, rich animal world and flora.

Dolzhanskaya village is located at the basis of Dolgaya Spit.

See also 
 Spits of Azov Sea
 Yeysk Spit

References 

Spits of Krasnodar Krai
Spits of the sea of Azov